Sailor Moon R: The Movie is a 1993 Japanese animated superhero fantasy film directed by Kunihiko Ikuhara and written by Sukehiro Tomita based on the Sailor Moon manga series written by Naoko Takeuchi. The film takes its name from the second arc of the Sailor Moon anime, Sailor Moon R, as Toei Company distributed it around the same time. The events portrayed seem to take place somewhere in the very end of the series, as Chibiusa knows about the identities of the Sailor Guardians, the characters are in the present rather than the future, and Usagi and Mamoru are back together. The film centers on the arrival of an alien named Fiore on Earth, who has a past with Mamoru and wishes to reunite with him. However, Fiore is being controlled by an evil flower called Xenian Flower, forcing Usagi and her friends to save Mamoru and the Earth from destruction.

Japanese theaters featured a 15-minute short recap episode before the film titled  (later as Make Up! Sailor Guardians).

The film was released theatrically in Japan on December 5, 1993, while Pioneer Entertainment released it in the United States on February 8, 2000. On January 13, 2017, Viz Media re-released the film re-dubbed and uncut for the first time in US theaters. The Sailor Moon R: The Movie redub also included the English dubbed 15-minute short Make Up! Sailor Guardians. It was later premiered in Canada on March 1, 2017.

Plot

Make Up! Sailor Guardians
Usagi and Chibiusa overhear two girls talking about the Sailor Guardians after they see a poster. As the girls debate over the smartest, most elegant, strongest, and the leader of the Sailor Guardians, Usagi grandly claims those titles for herself. Chibiusa shakes her head at Usagi's delusion. Clips appear from the debut of each Sailor Guardian, and that girl's image song plays in the background. When even Tuxedo Mask has been mentioned, and the girls are about to leave, Usagi butts in on their conversation and asks them directly about Sailor Moon. The girls give a series of glowing compliments about Sailor Moon, but unlike their analysis of the other Sailor Guardians, they also list her faults. After the girls leave, Usagi sarcastically apologizes to the viewers for being a clumsy cry-baby and then bursts into exaggerated tears.

The Promise of the Rose
A young Mamoru Chiba hands a mysterious boy a rose before he disappears, vowing to bring Mamoru a flower. In the present, Mamoru meets up with Usagi Tsukino and the Sailor Senshi at the Jindai Botanical Garden. Usagi attempts to kiss Mamoru, but when he suspects the other girls of spying on him, he walks off outside alone.

The stranger appears from the garden's fountain and takes Mamoru's hands into his own, which makes Usagi uncomfortable. Usagi tries to break the man's grasp from Mamoru, but is knocked down. The man vows that no one will prevent him from keeping his promise before disappearing again. At Rei Hino's temple, the Sailor Senshi discuss an asteroid which has started to approach Earth and on which Luna and Artemis have discovered traces of vegetal life. The talk turns into rumors about Mamoru's and Fiore's possible relationship, while Usagi thinks about how Mamoru had told her that he had no family and was alone, and how she had promised him she would be his family from now on.

Fiore sends his flower-monster henchwoman, to Tokyo to drain the population's life-energy, but the Sailor Senshi free them and destroy the monster. Fiore appears, revealing his responsibility for the attack, and uses a flower called a  before severely injuring the Sailor Senshi. Mamoru attempts to talk Fiore out of fighting but the Xenian controls Fiore's mind. After Mamoru saves Usagi from certain death by intercepting his attack, Fiore takes Mamoru to an asteroid rapidly approaching Earth and begins to revive him in a crystal filled with liquid. While in the crystal, Mamoru remembers meeting Fiore after his parents died in a car accident. Mamoru had previously assumed that he had made up the boy as an imaginary friend. Fiore explains that he had to leave Mamoru because of the Earth's unsuitable atmosphere; Mamoru gave Fiore a rose before disappearing. Fiore searched the galaxy to find a flower for Mamoru, finding the Xenian in the process. Seeking revenge on the humans for his loneliness, Fiore returns to Earth.

Meanwhile, Luna and Artemis tell the Sailor Senshi that the Xenian can destroy planets using weak-hearted people. Ami Mizuno realizes that the energy from the asteroid matches the flower-monster's evil energy, deducing that Fiore has hidden there. The Sailor Senshi decide to rescue Mamoru. Despite her initial reluctance, the Sailors and Chibiusa convince Usagi to save Mamoru and confront Fiore.

After the Sailor Senshi fly to the asteroid, Fiore reveals his plans to scatter flower-seeds to drain humanity's energy on Earth. The Sailor Senshi then fight hundreds of flower-monsters, but they end up captured. When Fiore orders Usagi to surrender, she is unable to feel his loneliness; Fiore begins to drain her life-force. Mamoru escapes and saves Sailor Moon by throwing a rose at Fiore. The rose embedded in Fiore's chest blossoms, freeing him from the Xenian's control. The flowers on the asteroid disappear, but it continues to hurtle towards Earth. Usagi uses the Silver Crystal to transform into Princess Serenity to change the course of the asteroid. Fiore then attempts to assault the group in a suicidal effort to defeat them, but upon coming into contact with the Silver Crystal, Fiore discovers the truth that when Usagi and Mamoru were children she gave Mamoru the rose that was once given to him after Fiore had left. Emotionally incapacitated, Fiore ignores the Xenian's pleas and allows her and himself to be vaporized by the Silver Crystal's powers. With Fiore and the Xenian destroyed by the Silver Crystal, Serenity, Endymion and the Sailor Senshi combine their powers to divert the asteroid away from the Earth. The Silver Crystal is shattered and Serenity dies of exhaustion. Back on Earth, despite Luna and Artemis' concern over why the Sailor Senshi are taking too long, Chibiusa assures them that the girls are all right.

In the aftermath, now safely drifting in orbit, the Senshi and Tuxedo Mask are devastated by Sailor Moon's death in her still form after her transformation brooch is damaged, saying that it wasn't worth it to survive if they lost the one most dear to them. The spirit of Fiore reappears and thanks Tuxedo Mask and his comrades for freeing him. Using a nectar-filled flower with Fiore's life-energy, Tuxedo Mask wets his lips with the nectar and kisses Sailor Moon, reviving her, restoring her transformation brooch and repowering the Silver Crystal. Fiore, reduced to the form of a child again, ascends to the afterlife to live in peace. She smiles weakly at them and says she told them she would protect everyone. The Senshi smile through their tears and collapse into her arms.

Voice cast

Make-up! Sailor Guardians

Production
The film was created by the same production staff of Sailor Moon R, with Kunihiko Ikuhara as a director, Sukehiro Tomita as a screenwriter, and Kazuko Tadano handling the character designs and animation direction.

Release

Japanese release
The film was released in Japanese theaters on December 5, 1993.

The Japanese Blu-ray collection of the three films was released on February 7, 2018, with this film titled Pretty Guardian Sailor Moon R: The Movie.

English release
The film was first released in North America on VHS by Pioneer Entertainment on August 31, 1999, in Japanese with English subtitles. Pioneer later released the film to uncut bilingual DVD on February 8, 2000, alongside another VHS release containing an edited version of the English dub. Pioneer re-released their DVD on January 6, 2004, under their "Geneon Signature Series" line. The DVDs later fell out of print when Pioneer/Geneon lost the license to the film. The edited version was also shown on TV in Canada on YTV and in the US on Cartoon Network's Toonami block.

The English dub was produced in association with Optimum Productions in Toronto, Canada, and featured most of the original DIC Entertainment English cast reprising their roles. The edited version of the dub was censored for content and replaced the music with cues from the DIC version of the first two seasons of the anime; the vocal song "Moon Revenge" was also replaced with "The Power of Love." The uncut version of the dub was only seen on the bilingual DVD, featured no censorship, and all of the original Japanese music was left intact, with the exception of the DIC theme song being used. However, no DVD or VHS release contained the "Make-up! Sailor Soldier" short.

In 2014, the film (including the "Make-Up! Sailor Guardian" short) was re-licensed for an updated English-language release in North America by Viz Media, who produced a new English dub of the film in association with Los Angeles-based Studiopolis and re-released it to DVD and Blu-ray on April 18, 2017. It has also been licensed in Australia and New Zealand by Madman Entertainment. In addition, Viz gave the film a limited theatrical release in the United States, beginning January 17, 2017 in association with Eleven Arts. The redub premiered in the United Artists Theater at the Ace Hotel, where it retained just the original title of Sailor Moon R: The Movie, rather than the subtitle The Promise of the Rose. The theatrical release included the "Make-Up! Sailor Guardian" short, and was available in both dubbed and subtitled screenings. The film was screened in North American theaters again nationwide with one-day showings as a double feature with Sailor Moon S: The Movie in association with Fathom Events. Dubbed screenings were on July 28, 2018, and subtitled screenings on July 30.

Reception
Rebecca Silverman of Anime News Network gave the film's Viz Media dub an "A−". She praised the animation, stating that it was "several cuts above what we typically see in the TV series". She also praised the film for distilling the franchise's themes effectively, its soundtrack and use of imagery relating to flowers. Charles Solomon of the Los Angeles Times also reacted positively to the film's portrayal of the main characters' "sisterly friendship" and praised Viz Media's dub for not censoring Fiore's implied feelings for Mamoru, unlike previous English translations.

Notes

References

External links
 
 
 Animerica review

1993 anime films
1990s animated superhero films
1990s Japanese superhero films
1990s teen fantasy films
Fiction about near-Earth asteroids
Films scored by Takanori Arisawa
Sailor Moon films